Katy Storie (born 7 August 1979) is an English female rugby union player. She represented  at the 2006 Women's Rugby World Cup.

Storie was a weightlifter representing Great Britain before she discovered rugby while attending Newcastle University.

References

1979 births
Living people
England women's international rugby union players
English female rugby union players
Female rugby union players